Livingston High School was a senior high school in Livingston, Alabama. It was a part of the Sumter County School District.

The first African-American students were admitted in 1966. In 1968 97.8% of the students were white and 84.3% of the teachers were white. Due to white flight, the percentage of white students dropped to .3% by 1970, as only four white students were enrolled, and about 33% of the teachers were white. Many white students had been placed in Sumter Academy.

The football team had a rivalry with  Sumter County High School. The impetus to merge came because of a declining population - the county had a total of 838 students divided between the two high schools in 2009 - as well as the condition of Sumter County High and budget issues. It merged with Sumter County High and became Sumter Central High School in 2011.

References

External links
 

Schools in Sumter County, Alabama
Public high schools in Alabama
2011 disestablishments in Alabama
Educational institutions disestablished in 2011